These are the representatives elected in the 2016 Philippine House of Representatives elections.
Seats highlighted in gray are districts in which boundaries were altered.

Luzon

National Capital Region

Ilocos Region

Cagayan Valley

Cordillera Administrative Region

Central Luzon

Calabarzon

Mimaropa

Bicol Region

Visayas

Western Visayas

Negros Island Region

Central Visayas

Eastern Visayas

Mindanao

Zamboanga Peninsula

Northern Mindanao

Davao Region

Soccsksargen

Caraga Region

Autonomous Region in Muslim Mindanao

References

External links
COMELEC - Official website of the Philippine Commission on Elections (COMELEC)
NAMFREL - Official website of National Movement for Free Elections (NAMFREL)
PPCRV - Official website of the Parish Pastoral Council for Responsible Voting (PPCRV)

2016 Philippine general election